Theydon Garnon is a village and civil parish in the Epping Forest district, in the county of Essex, England. The parish also includes the hamlet of Hobbs Cross.

History 
Also recorded as Thoydon Garnon and Coopersale, "Theydon" is thought to mean 'valley where thatch (material) grows' and "Garnon" derives from the Gernon family. A weekly market and annual fair was granted to Theydon Garnon in 1305. A workhouse operated in the parish from around 1704.

By 1851 the parish's population had reached 1,237. Epping Union Workhouse was in Theydon Garnon; it and Epping station also opened within the parish in 1865, but was included in the newly formed Epping Urban District in 1896, along with the village of Coopersale and the hamlets of Coopersale Street, and Fiddler's Hamlet. The reduction in the parish's size led to a reduction in population, down to 317 in 1901.

Amenities 
The village contains an Anglican parish church, dating back to the 13th Century and dedicated to All Saints. A primary school part-bears the village's name, but is located in the village of Coopersale in the neighbouring Epping parish.

Transport 
Theydon Garnon is very near the M25/M11 interchange, but there is no access to either motorway. The parish has no railway station, the nearest is Theydon Bois tube station.

Nearby settlements 
Nearby settlements include the town of Epping, the large village of Theydon Bois, the small village of Theydon Mount and the hamlets of Hobbs Cross and Fiddlers Hamlet.

References 

Villages in Essex
Civil parishes in Essex
Epping Forest District